Miss America 1983, the 56th Miss America pageant, was from on the Boardwalk Hall in Atlantic City, New Jersey on September 11, 1982 on NBC Network.

Pageant winner Debra Maffett later became a television personality and producer.

Results

Placements

Order of announcements

Top 10

Awards

Preliminary awards

Non-finalist awards

Judges
 Foster Brooks
 Wink Martindale
 Rod McKuen
 Chris Calloway
 Evelyn Ay Sempier
 Herman Vincent
 Caroline Tose

Contestants

External links
 Miss America official website

1983
1982 in the United States
1983 beauty pageants
1982 in New Jersey
September 1982 events in the United States
Events in Atlantic City, New Jersey